The Cordillera Central (Spanish for central mountain range) is part of the Andes in Peru. It extends in a northerly direction approximately between 11º 39’ and 12º 37’S and 75º 30’ and 76º 20’W (or between 11°37' and 12°26'S and 75°30' and 76°18'W) for about 60 km to 100 km. It contains the Paryaqaqa (P), Yauyos (Y) and Pichqa Waqra (PW) mountain ranges. It is located in the Junín Region and in the Lima Region. 

The name Cordillera Central is also applied for one of the three ranges that cross Peru in a northwesterly direction between the Cordillera Occidental ("the western range") where the Cordillera Central of the Junín and Lima Regions is located and the Cordillera Oriental ("the eastern range").  The mountaineer Evelio Echevarría uses the term for the La Viuda range and the Khaskaqucha range.

Mountains 
Other mountains are listed below:

References

Mountain ranges of Peru
 
 
Mountain ranges of Junín Region
Mountain ranges of Lima Region
Mountain ranges of the Andes